Venus Williams was the defending champion, but lost in the third round to Lucie Šafářová.

Simona Halep won the title, defeating Karolína Plíšková in the final, 6–4, 7–6(7–4).

Seeds
The top eight seeds received a bye into the second round.

The two Antwerp finalists also received a bye into the second round. They were as follows:

Draw

Finals

Top half

Section 1

Section 2

Bottom half

Section 3

Section 4

Qualifying

Seeds

Qualifiers

Lucky losers

Draw

First qualifier

Second qualifier

Third qualifier

Fourth qualifier

Fifth qualifier

Sixth qualifier

Seventh qualifier

Eighth qualifier

External links
 WTA tournament draws

Dubai Tennis Championships - Singles
2015 Dubai Tennis Championships